Podemos may refer to:
Podemos (Bolivia), Bolivian political party
Podemos (Spanish political party), Spanish political party
Podemos (Guatemala), Guatemalan political party
Podemos (Venezuela), Venezuelan political party
Juntos Podemos Más, Chilean political coalition
 Podemos (Brazil), Brazilian political party